The 1920 United States presidential election in Delaware took place on November 2, 1920. All contemporary 48 states were part of the 1920 United States presidential election. State voters chose three electors to the Electoral College, which selected the president and vice president.

Delaware was won by the Republican nominee, Senator Warren G. Harding of Ohio, over the Democratic nominee, Governor James M. Cox of Ohio. Harding ran with Governor Calvin Coolidge of Massachusetts, while Cox ran with future President Franklin D. Roosevelt of New York.

Results

See also
 United States presidential elections in Delaware

References

Notes

Delaware
1920
1920 Delaware elections